Dry drunk is a colloquial expression that describes an alcoholic who no longer drinks but otherwise maintains the same behavior patterns of an alcoholic. The objective of groups such as Narcotics Anonymous (NA) and Alcoholics Anonymous (AA) is not just to help their members stop abusing drugs and alcohol. It is acknowledged in these programs that addiction is more systemic than a "bad habit" and is fundamentally caused by self-centeredness. Long term membership in Alcoholics Anonymous has been found to reform pathological narcissism, and those who are sober but retain characteristics associated with addiction are known in AA as dry drunks. The term is used by AA in relation to feelings of anger, depression and resentment.

A dry drunk can be described as a person who refrains from alcohol or drugs, but still has all the unresolved emotional and psychological issues which might have fueled the addiction to begin with. These unresolved issues continue to have a hold on their psyche and hence, while they do not seek intoxication, they exhibit many of the other behavioural traits associated with addiction. In most cases, alcohol dependency is a substantial factor in the lives of the alcoholics and accepting sobriety comes with its own challenges and understanding of their personality. Despite leaving alcohol and de-addicting themselves, most of their personalities are an embodiment of their drunkard selves.

The dry drunk is portrayed with feelings of profound depression and frustration and with the indecisive feeling of wanting a drink that they have given up. Several alcoholics drink for about 10-20 years before maintaining sobriety and get used to the personality and character traits that are embodied by their drunkard selves. During this phase of dry drunk, the addicts face restlessness, frustration, anger, impatience and craving. The symptoms of dry drunkenness are irregular and in some individuals can be less intense while others remain unchanged as the period of sobriety increases. Some of the symptoms of dry drunkenness can be noticed in the initial phase of sobriety while others can manifest themselves later as some addicts work to suppress their dry drunk emotions. In any event, dry drunkenness can be cured through the many professionals trained in Addiction Recovery

The founder of Alcoholics Anonymous created the term.

See also 
 Alcoholism
 Substance abuse

References

Further reading 
 Understanding the Continuum of Addiction and the Addictive Personality: Just because you're not drinking doesn't mean that you're sober. Psychology Today

Alcohol abuse
Alcoholics Anonymous